In mathematics, Laplace's principle is a basic theorem in large deviations theory which is similar to Varadhan's lemma. It gives an asymptotic expression for the Lebesgue integral of exp(−θφ(x)) over a fixed set A as θ becomes large. Such expressions can be used, for example, in statistical mechanics to determining the limiting behaviour of a system as the temperature tends to absolute zero.

Statement of the result

Let A be a Lebesgue-measurable subset of d-dimensional Euclidean space Rd and let φ : Rd → R be a measurable function with

Then

where ess inf denotes the essential infimum. Heuristically, this may be read as saying that for large θ,

Application

The Laplace principle can be applied to the family of probability measures Pθ given by

to give an asymptotic expression for the probability of some event A as θ becomes large. For example, if X is a standard normally distributed random variable on R, then

for every measurable set A.

See also 
 Laplace's method

References

  

Asymptotic analysis
Large deviations theory
Probability theorems
Statistical mechanics
Mathematical principles
Theorems in analysis